West Head is the name of three separate headlands on New Zealand's South Island.

 , at the entrance to Okains Bay on Banks Peninsula.
 , at the end of a peninsula on the northern shore of Queen Charlotte Sound. See Pīrata / West Head.
 , a rocky headland at the entrance to Tory Channel.

The third of these is the easternmost point of the South Island, and should not be confused with West Cape, the westernmost point of the South Island. West Head marks the western side of the entrance to Tory Channel, and the corresponding East Head is located on Arapaoa Island.

Easternmost point of South Island
West Head, at the entrance to Tory Channel, is the easternmost point of the South Island. However, two other distinct headlands have very similar longitudes, sometimes leading to confusion and erroneous claims.

West Head, at the entrance to Tory Channel, is recorded by Land Information New Zealand as longitude 174.3154°E, and the easternmost tip is measured at 174.3157°E (174°18'57"E).

Cape Jackson, LINZ longitude 174.3134°E, easternmost tip measured at 174.3150°E (174°18'54"E), is about 100 metres further west.

Both West Head and Cape Jackson are at the end of long, narrow and difficult-to-reach peninsulas in the Marlborough Sounds. For this reason third-place Cape Campbell, LINZ longitude 174.2760°E, easternmost tip 174.2773°E (174°16'34") is sometimes mistakenly considered the easternmost point, but is about three kilometres further west.

Note that LINZ coordinates may refer to a prominent feature such as a hill top, while easternmost tips are measured on Wikimapia. There may also be discrepancies between coordinate systems used by different sources.

External references
West Head, from Land Information New Zealand.

Headlands of the Marlborough Region
Marlborough Sounds
Headlands of Canterbury, New Zealand